Szczerbice  is a village in the administrative district of Gmina Gaszowice, within Rybnik County, Silesian Voivodeship, in southern Poland.

The village has a population of 1,980.

References

Szczerbice